Armley Canal Road railway station was a station on the former Midland Railway between Leeds and Shipley. It served the Leeds suburb of Armley in West Yorkshire, England until closure in 1965.

History

The station was opened by the Leeds and Bradford Railway in 1846 (which was subsequently absorbed by the Midland Railway) which became part of the London Midland and Scottish Railway following the Grouping Act of 1923. The station, which had a street-level booking hall, consisted of two island platforms which were separated by double track. Passenger services stopped between the platforms. The outside lines, which were fenced off from the island platforms, were used by through trains. A wooden footbridge connected the two island platforms to the street-level entrance way and booking hall.

In 1948 the station passed on to the Eastern Region of British Railways following nationalisation. It was permanently closed by the British Railways Board as part of the Beeching Axe in March 1965.

After closure, the station building was retained on Canal Road and was later used as commercial premises.  The station sign has been repainted but not in its original colours or font.  Nothing remains of the wooden footbridge and the island platforms. The remains of the entrance archway that led onto the bridge was bricked up. A gap remains between the surviving two lines showing where the former island platforms formerly stood.

References

External links

 Armley Canal Road station on interactive 1947 O. S. map

Disused railway stations in Leeds
Railway stations in Great Britain opened in 1847
Railway stations in Great Britain closed in 1965
Armley
Beeching closures in England
Former Midland Railway stations
1847 establishments in England